Marshall Davis Ewell (August 18, 1844October 4, 1928) was an American lawyer.

Biography
Ewell was born at Oxford, Michigan, on August 18, 1844. He graduated from the University of Michigan Law School in 1868. He founded Kent College of Law, which merged with Chicago College of Law in 1887 to become Chicago-Kent College of Law. In 1969, Chicago-Kent became part of Illinois Institute of Technology.

He married Abbie Louise Walker in 1870 and they had two daughters.

He died at his home in Memphis, Tennessee, on October 4, 1928.

Works
Ewell wrote numerous publications and he edited Blackwell on Tax Titles, Evans on Agency, and Lindley on Partnership.  He was the author of:  
 Leading Cases on Disabilities (1876)  
 Treatise on the Law of Fixtures (1876; second edition, 1905)
 Essentials of the Law (1882; second edition, 1915)
 Manual of Medical Jurisprudence (1887; second edition, 1909)
 Essentials of Commercial Law, with Whigam and Skinner (1913)

References

University of Michigan Law School alumni
American legal writers
American legal scholars
1844 births
1928 deaths
People from Oxford, Michigan